Delhi–Ahmedabad High Speed Rail Corridor (Delhi–Ahmedabad HSR) is an approved high-speed rail line connecting India's capital Delhi with the city of Ahmedabad. When completed, it will be India's second high-speed rail line. It is also said to be an extension of Mumbai–Ahmedabad HSR corridor.

After Lidar surveys were completed in September 2020, the detailed projects report (DPR) was being prepared. On completion of this line, when combined with the Mumbai–Ahmedabad line, two of the most important cities in India will be linked via high-speed rail. This is estimated to cut travel time between the cities from fifteen hours to under five hours.

Construction
After the DPR was prepared, the construction was planned to start in the later half of 2020s. The alignment was chosen to run along with some of the existing railway line and highway in order to reduce the burden of land acquisition as experienced in other railway projects in India, such as the Mumbai-Ahmedabad line and Delhi Metro Pink Line which were significantly delayed due to land acquisition problems. The officials stated that it would take up to three to four years to acquire the land, shift utilities, get several clearances and NOCs for various departments, cut trees, and to complete other works. It would then take another three years to complete construction, moving the opening date to no sooner than 2031.

Stations
The route would originate from Dwarka Sector 21 in Delhi, then it would cross into Gurgaon at Chauma. The line would then run along Dwarka expressway till Ramaprastha City, then it would take a right turn to align with Delhi–Jaipur railway line and crossing at KMP Expressway before aligning with Delhi–Jaipur highway at Shajahapur Toll Plaza.

Project status

2020
 February :  NHRCL invites bids for Li-Dar survey in order to prepare final alignment design for the project.

2021
 January :  Tenders were awarded already and the work on LIDAR survey was in progress.
 July :  DPR preparation completed. The route was set to originate from Dwarka sector 21 in Delhi and a station was proposed in Manesar, Haryana. Officials stated that it'd take three to four years to acquire land and another three years for completing construction.

See also
 High-speed rail in India
Mumbai–Ahmedabad high-speed rail corridor
Delhi–Varanasi high-speed rail corridor
Delhi–Amritsar high-speed rail corridor

References

External links
 Preliminary Study 
 India's first bullet train project launched, by Respected PM Narendra Modi calls it New India's big dream
 OpenStreetMap with route of Mumbai–Ahmedabad high-speed rail corridor；Permanent link

High-speed railway lines in India
Standard gauge railways in India
Rail transport in Maharashtra
Rail transport in Gujarat
Rail transport in Rajasthan
Rail transport in Haryana
Proposed railway lines in India
Modi administration initiatives
Rail transport in Delhi
Transport in Ahmedabad
India–Japan relations
2028 in rail transport